Minuscule 867 (in the Gregory-Aland numbering), ε400 (von Soden), is a 14th-century Greek minuscule manuscript of the New Testament on parchment. The manuscript has no complex context, and some marginalia.

Description 

The codex contains the text of the four Gospels on 223 parchment leaves (size ), with one lacuna (Matthew 1:1-6:1). The text is written in one column per page, 20 lines per page.

Text 
The Greek text of the codex is a representative of the Byzantine text-type. Hermann von Soden classified it to the textual family Kr. Kurt Aland the Greek text of the codex placed in Category V.
According to the Claremont Profile Method it represents textual family Kr in Luke 1 and Luke 20, as a perfect member of the family. In Luke 10 no profile was made.

The text of the Pericope Adulterae (John 7:53-8:11) is marked by an obelus.

History 

F. H. A. Scrivener dated the manuscript to the 15th or 14th century, C. R. Gregory dated it to the 14th century.  Currently the manuscript is dated by the INTF to the 14th century.

The manuscript was added to the list of New Testament manuscripts by Scrivener (680e) and Gregory (867e). Gregory saw it in 1886.

Currently the manuscript is housed at the Vatican Library (Gr. 1895), in Rome.

See also 

 List of New Testament minuscules
 Biblical manuscript
 Textual criticism
 Minuscule 866
 Minuscule 868

References

Further reading

External links 
 

Greek New Testament minuscules
14th-century biblical manuscripts
Manuscripts of the Vatican Library